Cold sensitivity or cold intolerance is unusual discomfort felt by some people when in a cool environment.

There is much variation in the sensitivity to cold experienced by different people, with some putting on many layers of clothing while others in the same environment feel comfortable in one layer.

Cold sensitivity may be a symptom of hypothyroidism, anemia, fibromyalgia or vasoconstriction. Vitamin B12 deficiency usually accompanies cold intolerance as well. There are other conditions that may cause a cold intolerance, including low body weight, high body temperature and low blood pressure. There may also be differences in people in the expression of uncoupling proteins, thus affecting their amount of thermogenesis. Psychology may also play a factor in perceived temperature.

See also
 Apparent temperature
 Thermoception
 Raynaud syndrome

References

Sensory systems
Symptoms and signs
Sensitivities